The protected areas of Albania comprise a number of various current designations across the territory of the country. The national policy for governing and management of the protected areas is implemented by the Ministry of Environment and Tourism through the National Agency of Protected Areas of Albania (AKZM). Currently, there are 799 protected areas including 14 national parks, 1 marine park, 2 nature reserves, 22 managed nature reserves, 5 protected landscapes and 770 other protected areas of various categories representing 21.3% of the territory as of 2022. Further a biosphere reserve, 3 World Heritage Sites, 4 ramsar sites, 45 important plant areas and 16 important bird areas are located in Albania. Meanwhile, the Albanian government has proclaimed the Coastline of Albania and the Tirana Greenbelt as areas of national importance.

However, protected areas are being threatened by illegal logging, forest fires, and the construction of hydroelectric power plants which have prompted several protests from environmentalists and civil society, meanwhile the logging and hunting moratorium has somewhat successfully revived the fauna and flora of some protected areas.

In 2020, the Albanian Government has revamped the protected areas map by changing designations, coverage areas, and by adding new areas to the network such as the Vjosa River.

List of protected areas

Biosphere Reserves

Archaeological Parks

References

External links  
National Agency of Protected Areas (AKZM) - Official Website (English)
National Parks and Protected Areas Portal Official Website
Official Coastal Agency Website (Albanian)

 

 
Albania geography-related lists